Episcopal Day School may refer to:

Episcopal Day School (Augusta, Georgia)
Episcopal Day School (Pensacola, Florida)
Episcopal Day School (Tennessee)
Advent Episcopal Day School
All Saint's Episcopal Day School
Holy Trinity Episcopal Day School
St. Francis Episcopal Day School (Texas)
St. Patrick's Episcopal Day School
St. Paul's Episcopal Day School
Trinity Episcopal Day School